Katorabhar Khoon (also known as Stinger Stung) is a 1920 Hindi film produced by Dwarkadas Sampat. It was based on a story written by Mohanlal G. Dave, and directed by Shree Nath Patankar.

References

External links

1920 films
Indian black-and-white films
Indian silent films